The Fall of the Empire is a Russian TV miniseries in ten episodes  directed by Vladimir Khotinenko, broadcast in March 2005.

It is set in World War I, following Russian counterintelligence officer Sergei Pavlovich Kostin (Aleksandr Baluev), a veteran of the Russo-Japanese War, who works to uncover enemy plots aided by his sidekick Ivan Karlovich Shtol'ts (Marat Basharov).

Cast

Main characters of the series 
 Alexander Baluev - Captain of counterintelligence Sergei Pavlovich Kostin
 Sergei Makovetsky - Professor of Law, and then the captain of the Army Intelligence Alexander Mikhailovich Nesterovsky
 Maria Mironova - Elena Ivanovna Saburova
 Chulpan Khamatova - Olga Semenovna Nesterovskaya
 Marat Basharov - lieutenant counterintelligence Ivan Karlovich Stolz
 Andrey Krasko - non-commissioned counterintelligence officer Nikolai Alexeyevich Strelnikov ''

The real historical figures in the series 
 Vladislav Galkin - head of counterintelligence Boris Nikitin
 Sergei Nikonenko - Paul von Rennenkampf
 Alexander Bashirov - Lavr Kornilov
 Fedor Bondarchuk - Anton Denikin
 Dmitry Pevtsov - Nikolay Dukhonin
 Andrey Nevraev - Emperor Nicholas II
 Andrei Zibrov - Pavel Pereverzev
 Alexander Mezentsev - General Aleksei Brusilov
 Alexey Medvedev - Nikolai Krylenko
 Danil Lavrenov - Leonid Kannegisser
 Alexander Voitov - Moisei Uritsky
 Yuri Tsurilo - Yuri Steklov
 Valentina Kasyanova - Nadezhda Krupskaya
 Victor Smirnov - Colonel Moroz (prototype - Viktor Klimenko)
 Maria Poroshina - socialist revolutionary Maria Kovskaya (prototype - Irina Kakhovskaya)
 Stanislav Nikolsky - Semyon Roshal
 Viktor Bychkov - Stepnin, also as Yakov Ganetsky
 Alexander Pashutin - General Grigoriev

Other characters 
 Ivan Agafonov - janitor
 Sergey Astakhov - Karevsky
 Andrey Astrakhantsev - socialist revolutionary Leonid Charny
 Johan Bott - The German Soldier Karl
 Gosha Kutsenko - Gibson
 Juozas Budraitis - Kranz
 Axel Buchholz - Stolberg
 Yuri Vasiliev - owner of the cinema "Lotos"
 Viktor Verzhbitsky - Ghanaian
 Sergei Garmash - Sakharov, the prophet "Kassandrov"
 Tatyana Dogileva - hostess of the apartment, Zina's mother
 Sergey Dreyden - Grohovsky
 Aleksei Kravchenko - Staff Captain Rysin
 Evgeny Leonov-Gladyshev - socialist revolutionary Shilenko
 Alexander Lykov - filmmaker
 Dmitry Maryanov - Captain Bredel
 Darya Moroz - maid Katya
 Daniel Olbrychski - Strombakh
 Sergey Parshin - Ryabikov
 Alexander Pashkov - Mitya, driver (in 3rd and 6th episodes is named Pasha)
 Alexander Polovtsev - Antipov
 Ksenia Rappoport - Alina Gorskaya
 Igor Sklyar - Ricks
 Semyon Strugachev - Franz Fleishman
 Glafira Tarkhanov - Tanya Zaitseva
 Mikhail Trukhin - Maletsky
 Dmitry Ulyanov - Stetsevich
 Nina Usatova - Zaitseva, Aunt Tanya
 Ville Haapasalo - Tarvilainen
 Konstantin Khabensky - Boris Sergeevich Lozovsky
 Vladimir Khotinenko - Colonel Yakubov
 Mikhail Porechenkov - captain with a white flag (finale of the 8th series, in titles is indicated as ensign)
 André Hennicke - employee of the German embassy, then captain of the German army intelligence Rigert
 Larissa Shakhvorostova - socialist revolutionary Kiseleva
 Dmitriy Shevchenko - socialist revolutionary Semchenko
 Justina Rudite - girl
 Alexander Rublev - soldier (in the episodes "Red Bows" and "Prayer Officer")

References

External links

World War I television films
World War I spy films
Russian television miniseries
2005 in Russian television
Films directed by Vladimir Khotinenko
Television series based on actual events
2005 Russian television series debuts
2005 Russian television series endings
2000s Russian television series
Russian drama television series
Channel One Russia original programming
Russian World War I films